Rajesh Kumar Chhibber is the former CEO and managing director of Jammu and Kashmir Bank.

Banking career
He joined the services of the Bank as Probationary Officer in the year 1982.
Chhibber served as Interim Chairman and MD of J&K bank from 10 June 2019 to 9 October 2019, and has been serving as the chairman and MD of the bank under section 10BB of the Banking Regulation Act, 1949 since 10 October 2019. In 2019, following the formation of the union territories of Jammu and Kashmir, the Anti-corruption Bureau started investigations into alleged corrupt practices by a number of bank officials, including former bank chairpersons Parvaiz Ahmad Nengroo and Mushtaq Ahmad Sheikh. In June 2019, the Reserve Bank of India had approved the appointment of R K Chhibber as interim chairman and managing director (CMD) of the Bank, following the removal of Parvez Ahmad from the post by the erstwhile state government.
 He also served as the Chairman of J&K Grameen Bank. He was elevated as the Executive President on 1 June 2018. He was succeeded by Baldev Prakash on 27 October 2021.

References

People from Jammu and Kashmir
Living people
People from Jammu
People from Jammu district
Year of birth missing (living people)
Date of birth missing (living people)